Raphael Deseption "Choo" Freeman (born October 20, 1979) is a retired Major League Baseball outfielder.

Career
Freeman played American football in high school, setting a state record by catching 50 touchdowns for Dallas Christian High School in Mesquite, Texas, and being selected three times to the all-state team. In his overall athletic career at Dallas Christian, he helped the school win six state championships in various sports and signed with Texas A&M to play football, but chose baseball when he selected by the Colorado Rockies in the first round of the 1998 Major League Baseball draft.

With Carolina, he hit .291 with 12 home runs and 15 stolen bases and was selected as a "Southern League" All-Star causing his stock to rise in the organization.

In , he found himself starting in center field for the Colorado Springs Sky Sox, the Rockies Triple-A affiliate, a position he would retain for most of the next couple of seasons. His best season with the Sky Sox was in  where he hit .297 with 10 home runs and 50 RBI.

He made his major league debut with the Rockies on June 4, 2004, against the San Francisco Giants as a pinch hitter. He got his first two major league hits the next day in his first start for the Rockies, also against the Giants.

After hitting .280 with the Sky Sox in 2005, Freeman rejoined the Rockies for limited action in September before making the team full-time for the  season as a reserve outfielder. He hit .237 in the 88 games he played in during the 2006 season.

On February 2, 2007, Freeman was released by the Rockies.

On February 14, 2007, he signed a minor league contract with the Los Angeles Dodgers, but he failed to make the major league roster out of spring training and was reassigned to the Dodgers Triple-A affiliate, the Las Vegas 51s. He hit .270 in 121 games with the 51s and knocked in 48 runs becoming a free agent after the season ended.

Personal life
Freeman is a cousin of Minnesota Twins Gold Glove right fielder Torii Hunter. He married Jamie Freeman in 2010. In 2008 the couple had a daughter named Zailey.

References

External links

(Freeman) chooses baseball over A&M – Baseball America article

1979 births
Living people
Major League Baseball center fielders
Colorado Rockies players
Baseball players from Arkansas
African-American baseball players
Sportspeople from Pine Bluff, Arkansas
Arizona League Rockies players
Asheville Tourists players
Salem Avalanche players
Carolina Mudcats players
Colorado Springs Sky Sox players
Las Vegas 51s players
Texas A&M University alumni
21st-century African-American sportspeople
20th-century African-American sportspeople